Milan Karatantchev (Bulgarian: Милан Каратанчев) (born 17 August 1959) is a Bulgarian former footballer who played as a goalkeeper for Belasitsa Petrich, Arda Kardzhali, and most notably for Botev Plovdiv, where he is considered a club legend. Following his retirement, he also became a referee. Subsequently, he was a secretary of the refereeing commission for the zonal council in Plovdiv. Outside of football, Karatantchev has also found employment as a firefighter.

References

1959 births
Living people
People from Petrich
Bulgarian footballers
First Professional Football League (Bulgaria) players
PFC Belasitsa Petrich players
Botev Plovdiv players
FC Arda Kardzhali players
Association football goalkeepers
Sportspeople from Blagoevgrad Province